"I Am What I Am" is a 2022 song by Maltese singer Emma Muscat. The song was released on 14 March 2022, as a replacement for Muscat's previous entry for the Eurovision Song Contest 2022, "Out of Sight". The song represented Malta in the Eurovision Song Contest 2022 after Muscat won Malta Eurovision Song Contest 2022, Malta's national final.

Release 
The song was released on 14 March 2022, after heavy speculation that Muscat would change her song. According to the rules of the contest, the winner could send any song they wished, and could change it if they wanted to.

Swedish singer Dotter, fiancée of Dino Medanhodžić, one of the song's composers, provides backing vocals on the studio version of the song.

Eurovision Song Contest

At Eurovision 
According to Eurovision rules, all nations with the exceptions of the host country and the "Big Five" (France, Germany, Italy, Spain and the United Kingdom) are required to qualify from one of two semi-finals in order to compete for the final; the top ten countries from each semi-final progress to the final. The European Broadcasting Union (EBU) split up the competing countries into six different pots based on voting patterns from previous contests, with countries with favourable voting histories put into the same pot. On 25 January 2022, an allocation draw was held which placed each country into one of the two semi-finals, as well as which half of the show they would perform in. Malta was placed into the second semi-final, held on 12 May 2022, and performed sixth, in the first half of the show.

Charts

References 

2022 songs
2022 singles
Eurovision songs of Malta
Eurovision songs of 2022
Warner Music Group singles